Big Brother Cheng is a 1975 sequel to the Hong Kong hit crime drama The Teahouse directed by Kuei Chih-Hung. Written by On Szeto, it follows the eponymous character as he continues to protect his community from thugs.

Cast

Kuan Tai Chen as Wang 'Big Brother' Cheng
Karen Yeh as Mrs. Wang
Yue Wong as 'Hak-zai' Mun
Lin Tung as Police Officer

External links
 
Hong Kong Cinemagic entry
Hong Kong Digital entry

1975 films
1970s Cantonese-language films
Hong Kong action films
Shaw Brothers Studio films
1970s action films
1975 crime drama films
1970s Hong Kong films